Hahnheim is an Ortsgemeinde – a municipality belonging to a Verbandsgemeinde, a kind of collective municipality – in the Mainz-Bingen district in Rhineland-Palatinate, Germany.

Geography

Location
Hahnheim lies between Mainz and Worms on the river Selz. The winegrowing centre belongs to the Verbandsgemeinde Rhein-Selz, whose seat is in Oppenheim.

Politics

Municipal council
The council is made up of 17 council members, counting the part-time mayor, with seats apportioned thus:

(as at municipal election held on 13 June 2004)

Coat of arms
The municipality's arms might be described thus: Per fess gules and argent, a cock repassant counterchanged.

Culture and sightseeing

Jewish graveyard
In the countryside towards Köngernheim on the highway going towards Bundesstraße 420 is an old Jewish graveyard.

Biotopes
In the countryside, especially along the Selz and on the former Alzey–Bodenheim railway right-of-way – the “Amiche” – several biotopes have been established.

Economy and infrastructure

Transport
The municipality is crossed by the L 432 state road. Bundesstraße 420 lies 2 km to the south. The A 60 and A 63 autobahns can be reached by car in 20 and 10 minutes respectively.

References

External links

Municipality’s official webpage 

Municipalities in Rhineland-Palatinate
Mainz-Bingen
Rhenish Hesse